The Habermas–Rawls debate is the exchange which took place between John Rawls and Jürgen Habermas in The Journal of Philosophy in 1995.

See also
 Cassirer–Heidegger debate
 
 Foucault–Habermas debate

References

Further reading

External links

Analytic philosophy
Continental philosophy
Intellectual history
John Rawls
Jürgen Habermas
Philosophical debates